Dave Villwock (born February 10, 1954) is a hydroplane driver, known best for racing Unlimited Hydroplanes.

Villwock has the most victories in unlimited hydroplane history for a driver with 67.

Villwock won ten National High Point Championships as a driver. Eight of those championships came while piloting Miss Budweiser. Villwock also won ten American Power Boat Association Gold Cup championships in his career.

On April 10, 2021, it was announced that Villwock would come out of retirement to drive for Sharon and Kelly Stocklin's Bucket List Racing team for the 2021 season.

References

American motorboat racers
Living people
1950s births